is an unmanned railway station in Horonobe, Teshio District, Hokkaidō, Japan. According to JR Hokkaidō, less than 10 passengers use the station daily, on average.

Lines
Hokkaido Railway Company
Sōya Main Line Station W66

Layout
Toikanbetsu Station has a single side platform.

Adjacent stations

References

Stations of Hokkaido Railway Company
Railway stations in Hokkaido Prefecture
Railway stations in Japan opened in 1923